Phyllomacromia picta is a species of dragonfly in the family Corduliidae. It is found in Angola, Botswana, Burundi, Chad, Ethiopia, Kenya, Malawi, Mozambique, Namibia, South Africa, Tanzania, Uganda, Zambia, and Zimbabwe. Its natural habitats are subtropical or tropical moist lowland forests, dry savanna, moist savanna, subtropical or tropical dry shrubland, subtropical or tropical moist shrubland, rivers, and intermittent rivers.

References

Corduliidae
Taxonomy articles created by Polbot